Bel-Air is a station on Line 6 of the Paris Métro in the 12th arrondissement. The station is located under the Boulevard de Picpus, between the districts of Picpus and Bel-Air.

History
The station was opened on 1 March 1909 with the extension of the line from Place d'Italie to Nation. The station was closed during World War II and remained closed for a prolonged period, not reopening until 7 January 1963. It is named after the Bel-Air quarter.

Passenger services

Access
The station has three accesses located in front of nos. 15, 32 and 34 of Boulevard de Picpus.

Station layout

Platforms
The station is in the open air at ground level, but the lines are underground to the north and to the south: the trains ascend to the surface before the station to descend when leaving it. This layout was required to clear the railway that connected the former station of Paris-Bastille (near the current Bastille station) to the valley of the Marne, via the former station of Reuilly near Bel-Air. This line was diverted to become part of RER A in 1969.

The station's single entrance to the station leads to the back of trains from Nation and to the front of trains from Charles de Gaulle–Étoile.

Bus connections
The station has no connection with the RATP bus network.

Places of interest

The old railway to Paris-Bastille was converted in the 1990s into the Promenade Plantée — a 4.5 km long elevated garden connecting to the Bastille to the Porte de Saint-Mandé. Cycling and rollerskating is allowed on this section.

The Rothschild Hospital is in the immediate vicinity and the Armand Trousseau Hospital for children is further off.

Gallery

References
 Roland, Gérard (2003). Stations de métro. D’Abbesses à Wagram. Éditions Bonneton.

Paris Métro stations in the 12th arrondissement of Paris
Railway stations in France opened in 1909